Pongrawit Jantawong (Thai: พงศ์รวิช จันทวงษ์; born 7 October 2000) is a Thai footballer currently playing as a midfielder for Chiangmai, on loan from BG Pathum United.

Career statistics

Club

Notes

References

External links

2000 births
Living people
Pongrawit Jantawong
Pongrawit Jantawong
Pongrawit Jantawong
Association football midfielders
J3 League players
Pongrawit Jantawong
Cerezo Osaka U-23 players
Cerezo Osaka players
Pongrawit Jantawong
Pongrawit Jantawong
Expatriate footballers in Japan